Yotsapon Teangdar (born 6 April 1992), simply known as Toey, is a Thai professional footballer who plays as a goalkeeper for Thai League 1 club Buriram United.

Biography
Yotsapon Teangdar is from Prasat district of Surin province. He attended secondary school at Prasat Wittayakarn School, where he won several national competitions with the school's football team. He was selected for Thailand's National U-16 Team for the 2008 AFC U-16 Championship, and briefly joined Surin before signing with Buriram PEA's youth team in 2010.

He spent his first year on loan to Surin F.C., before joining Buriram's senior team as a second substitute (Siwarak Tedsungnoen was the team's main goalkeeper). In 2012, Yotsapon was sent to train with Leicester City in England for six months. He made a few appearances for Buriram in the 2012 Thai Premier League, and was called up to Thailand's senior National Team for the 2013 King's Cup and the 2015 AFC Asian Cup qualifiers (also as a substitute).

With Buriram, Yotsapon continued to serve as a substitute, making a few appearances with the B team, including their AFC Champions League match against Shandong Luneng on 4 May 2016. He also spent some seasons on loan to Phichit and Khon Kaen United in the Division 1 and Division 2 leagues.

Honours

Club
Buriram United
 Thai League 1 
  Champions (5) : 2013, 2014, 2015, 2017, 2018
 Thai FA Cup 
  Winners (2) : 2013, 2015
 Thai League Cup 
  Winners (3) : 2013, 2015, 2016
 Thailand Champions Cup
  Champions (1) : 2019
 Toyota Premier Cup
  Winner (2) : 2014, 2016
 Kor Royal Cup 
  Winners (4) : 2013, 2014, 2015, 2016
 Mekong Club Championship
  Winner (1) : 2015, 2016

References

External links
 

1992 births
Living people
Yotsapon Teangdar
Yotsapon Teangdar
Yotsapon Teangdar
Yotsapon Teangdar
Association football goalkeepers